The Plains Art Museum is a fine arts museum located in downtown Fargo, North Dakota, United States.

History 
The history of the museum dates back to 1965 when the "Red River Art Center" opened in the former Moorhead, Minnesota, post office. The name of the museum was changed when it was incorporated with the Rourke Art Gallery to form the "Plains Art Museum" in 1975. After a 1987 schism resulting the departure of founding director James O'Rourke, the Plains Art Museum and the Rourke Art Museum and Gallery became separate institutions. The Museum remained in the downtown Moorhead location until 1996. In October 1997, the Museum relocated to a renovated turn-of-the-century International Harvester warehouse in downtown Fargo, North Dakota. The American Alliance of Museums granted accreditation to Plains Art Museum in 2003. This made the Plains Art Museum one of two museums in North Dakota which has received this distinction.

The Plains Art Museum acquired the old International Harvester warehouse building in 1994.

Permanent collection 
The museum's permanent collection contains approximately three thousand works including national and regional contemporary art, traditional American Indian art, and traditional folk art.  Artists whose work is represented include Andy Warhol, James Rosenquist, Salvador Dalí, Ellsworth Kelly, Helen Frankenthaler, and Sol LeWitt.

Collection on Wheels
In 1993, the Plains Art Museum began the Rolling Plains Art Gallery, a climate-controlled semi-trailer which traveled to communities in North Dakota and Minnesota. The semi-trailer not only transported the artwork, but also served as the gallery itself. To create a richer experience, an art educator travelled along with the select pieces from the permanent collection. The Rolling Plains Art Gallery is not currently touring.

Podcasts 
Joe Williams, director of Native American programs at the Plains Art Museum, hosts the weekly podcast "5 Plain Questions," where he interviews Indigenous artists. The podcast launched in May 2020 and is produced in conjunction with Eleven Warrior Arts.

Notes

External links 
 Plains Art Museum website

Art museums and galleries in North Dakota
Art museums established in 1975
Museums in Fargo, North Dakota
1975 establishments in North Dakota